Denis Verschueren (11 February 1897 – 18 April 1954) was a Belgian racing cyclist.

External links 

Cyclinghalloffame

1897 births
1954 deaths
Belgian male cyclists
Cyclists from Antwerp Province
People from Berlaar